Bishop Williamson may refer to:

 Robert Williamson (bishop) (born 1932), retired religious leader in the Church of England
 Richard Williamson (bishop) (born 1940), traditionalist Catholic bishop